School Spirits may refer to:

 School Spirits (2012 TV series), a 2012 American paranormal documentary television series which aired on the Syfy channel
 School Spirits (2023 TV series), a 2023 American supernatural drama series released on Paramount+